AMP deaminase 3 is an enzyme that in humans is encoded by the AMPD3 gene.

This gene encodes a member of the AMP deaminase gene family. The encoded protein is a highly regulated enzyme that catalyzes the hydrolytic deamination of adenosine monophosphate to inosine monophosphate, a branch point in the adenylate catabolic pathway. This gene encodes the erythrocyte (E) isoforms, whereas other family members encode isoforms that predominate in muscle (M) and liver (L) cells. Mutations in this gene lead to the clinically asymptomatic, autosomal recessive condition erythrocyte AMP deaminase deficiency. Alternatively spliced transcript variants encoding different isoforms of this gene have been described.

Model organisms 

Model organisms have been used in the study of AMPD3 function. A conditional knockout mouse line, called Ampd3tm2a(KOMP)Wtsi was generated as part of the International Knockout Mouse Consortium program — a high-throughput mutagenesis project to generate and distribute animal models of disease to interested scientists.

Male and female animals underwent a standardized phenotypic screen to determine the effects of deletion. Twenty eight tests were carried out on mutant mice and four significant abnormalities were observed. Mutant animals had increased IgG1 levels, increased trabecular bone thickness, decreased B cell numbers / increased granulocyte number and unusual brain histopathology (the thickness of the stratum radiatum was reduced and the dorsal 3rd ventricle area was increased).

A second mouse line, called Ampd3T689A, was generated by ENU mutagenesis. This mouse carries a mutation which increases AMPD3 function. Mutant animals have severely reduced erythrocyte lifespan, cyclic erythropoiesis, splenomegaly, and resistance to infection with Plasmodium chabaudi.

References

External links

Further reading 

 
 
 
 
 
 
 
 
 
 
 
 
 

Genes mutated in mice